Seven Lakes High School (SLHS) is a public senior high school located in Fort Bend County, Texas, United States, inside the Cinco Ranch area south of the city of Katy. Many communities such as Seven Meadows, Grand Lakes, and Cinco Ranch are zoned to the school. While the school has a Katy address, it is within the extraterritorial jurisdiction of Houston, and is a high school of the Katy Independent School District (KISD).

History
The school was originally planned by Katy ISD to relieve overcrowding at Cinco Ranch High School and Katy High School and to better facilitate the influx of students due to new development planned in the general Katy area. The school plan was the same general design used for two other KISD schools, Morton Ranch High School and Cinco Ranch High School, and was designed by PBK Architects. The school's first year in operation was the 2005-2006 school year and had its first graduating class of 408 students in the 2007-2008 school year.  The school was nominated a "National Blue Ribbon School of 2008."

Background
The school is located in the Katy Independent School District, and has the distinction of being the largest high school construction project at one time in the state of Texas. Seven Lakes was designed by PBK Architects, as were many other area schools. It is also the second largest, as well as the most expensive, school in the United States to be built at one time. The total cost of the school came around to $77,424,704 after construction was complete. The name of the school is derived from two major communities that are zoned to it, Seven Meadows and Grand Lakes, taking "Seven" from the name of the Seven Meadows community and "Lakes" from the name of the Grand Lakes community. While the school is meant only for a maximum of 3,000 students, schools in Katy ISD often become overcrowded due to the rapid development in the area as was the case in 2012, when Seven Lakes reached its peak of 3,957 students.

The school maintains a rivalry of sorts with Cinco Ranch High School, another high school also located in the same school district as Seven Lakes (Katy Independent School District) and located 3 miles away. Logically, much of the area now zoned to Seven Lakes was originally zoned to Cinco Ranch High School before Seven Lakes opened, and much of the area zoned to the new Tompkins High School was previously zoned to Seven Lakes.

Demographics
 African American 7.10%
 Asian 29.20%
 Hispanic 24.42%
 Native American 0.14%
 White (non-Hispanic) 36.43%
 Two or More Races 2.58%

Economically Disadvantaged 14.08%

Campus
Gilbane Building Co. built the school and PBK Architects designed the school.

The school has the following facilities:

Natatorium with diving equipment
9 tennis courts
Weight lifting room
Aux. Weight Room
900 computers
Wireless technology
Performing Arts Center
Black Box Theatre
2 dark rooms
2 science labs
1 science prep area
4 art labs with courtyard
Fine Arts Hallway with art rooms, a band hall, orchestra room and choir room

Academics

Advanced Placement courses
Seven Lakes offers a number of Advanced Placement course options to higher-achieving students, with 28 classroom AP courses being offered during the 2021-2022 School Year in a variety of subject areas.
Number Taken (2017)= 3,078
Pass Rate= 90%

2017 college entrance exams
SAT (SLHS Average vs. National Average)
Evidence Based Reading & Writing 615 vs. 538
Math 620 vs. 533
ACT (SLHS Average vs. National Average) 
Composite 25.9 vs. 21.0

Seven Lakes High School met state standards and earned distinctions in 6 out of 6 areas that were surveyed by the Texas Education Agency in 2019.

Athletics

State championships
2007 Texas 4A Boys Cross Country State Champions
2011 5A wrestling 
2013 5A wrestling
2018 6A Boys 4x100m relay
2020 6A volleyball

Activities

State championships
2008 4A UIL Academic Decathlon
2010 5A UIL Academic Decathlon
2012 5A UIL Computer Science
2008 Texas 4A UIL Social Studies
2010 4A UIL Social Studies
2010 5A UIL Current Issues/Events 
2011 5A UIL Current Issues/Events 
2012 5A UIL Current Issues/Events 
2010 5A UIL Spelling 
2011 5A UIL Spelling 
2012 5A UIL Spelling 
2012 5A UIL Literary Criticism

Enrollment trends
 2012-2013 School Year = 3,957 Students (926 graduating seniors)
 2013-2014 School Year = 3,584 Students (988 graduating seniors)
 2014-2015 School Year = 3,464 Students (1,003 graduating seniors)

Feeder patterns
The following elementary schools feed into Seven Lakes (non-comprehensive):
 Roosevelt Alexander Elementary 
 Bonnie Holland Elementary
 Michael Griffin Elementary (partial)
 Odessa Kilpatrick Elementary (partial)
 Stan C. Stanley Elementary (partial)
 Tom Wilson Elementary (partial)

The following middle schools feed into Seven Lakes High School:
 Beckendorff Junior High School
 Seven Lakes Junior High School (partial)

Notable alumni
 Caleb Benenoch — NFL guard 
 Conner Capel — MLB outfielder
 Jon Duplantier — MLB pitcher 
 Donnie Hart — MLB pitcher 
 Lina Hidalgo — Harris County, Texas judge
 Michael Nelson — soccer player
 Sage Northcutt — American mixed martial artist

References

External links

2005 establishments in Texas
Educational institutions established in 2005
Public high schools in Fort Bend County, Texas
Katy Independent School District high schools